The 1958 United States Grand Prix for Sports Cars was a sports car race held at Riverside International Raceway on October 12, 1958. It was the fourth and final round of the 1958 USAC Road Racing Championship season, the seventeenth round of the Sports Car Club of America's Pacific Coast Championship, the second running of the Riverside Grand Prix, and the first post-World War II running of the United States Grand Prix. Chuck Daigh won the race overall, driving one of Lance Reventlow's Scarab-Chevrolets. The race is also noteworthy in the annals of international racing, as the strong second-place finish by a local driver named Dan Gurney earned him a test drive in a factory Ferrari Formula 1 car, effectively launching the Californian's legendary racing career.

The weather at this event was very warm, even for a desert climate that routinely saw daytime temperatures of 100F plus during the summer. Even with the global warming that emerged decades after the late 1950s, the maximum temperature of Riverside, California never exceeded  for the month of October 2013.

Entry
The race was open to cars meeting the Sports Car Club of America's B Modified through G Modified classes.  Although named "modified", most of the cars in classes C through G were factory-built sports racing cars.  The field was unusually large for an American sports car race, attracted in large part by a large purse consisting of $14,500 ($ in today's money).

Qualifying
Pole position winners in each class are marked in bold.

Race result
Class winners marked in bold.

Time of race: 2 hours, 17 minutes, 15 seconds
Average speed:

Support races
Two support races were held: a production car race won by Skip Hudson in a Chevrolet Corvette, and an under-1400cc race won by Jock Ross in a Cooper-Climax.

References

United States Grand Prix
United States Grand Prix for Sports Cars
United States Grand Prix
United States Grand Prix
Los Angeles Times Grand Prix
United States Grand Prix for Sports Cars
United States Grand Prix for Sports Cars
History of Riverside, California